Glimpses: A Collection of Nightrunner Short Stories is a short story collection for Lynn Flewelling's Nightrunner series. Set in a fantasy world, the collection follows the adventures of a complex 'faie thief and his apprentice. It fills gaps in the main story. Glimpses: A Collection of Nightrunner Short Stories was released on September 19, 2010.

Plot
Glimpses explores "lost" moments from Flewelling's popular Nightrunner series, events alluded to or passed over - Alec's parents and childhood, Seregil's early liaisons in Skala, Seregil and Alec's first night as lovers, and how Seregil and Micum met. Each story offers a new perspective on events readers have speculated about for years.

Stories
 "Misfit"
 "The Wild"
 "By the River"
 "The Bond"
 "The Summer Players" (an excerpt from The Summer Players, the working title of what became Casket of Souls)

Characters
Seregil
Alec
Micum
Nysander
Thero

References

External links
Lynn Flewelling's Official Website
Glimpses in Philadelphia Library
Glimpses (Lynn Flewelling's livejournal)

2010 American novels
American fantasy novels
Nightrunner series
American LGBT novels